Leonardo Mario Bernacch (January 5, 1935 – April 10, 2012) was the Roman Catholic titular bishop of Tabaicara and bishop of the Roman Catholic Apostolic Vicariate  of Camiri, Bolivia.

Ordained to the priesthood in 1958, Bernacchi became bishop in 1993 and retired in 2009.

Notes

20th-century Roman Catholic bishops in Bolivia
1935 births
2012 deaths
21st-century Roman Catholic bishops in Bolivia
Roman Catholic bishops of Camiri